Anna Karenina is a 1953 Soviet historical drama film directed by Tatyana Lukashevich and starring Alla Tarasova, Nikolai Sosnin and Pavel Massalsky. It is based on Leo Tolstoy's 1878 novel Anna Karenina.

Plot summary

Cast
 Alla Tarasova as Anna Arkadyevna Karenina 
 Nikolai Sosnin as Aleksei Aleksandrovich Karenin  
 Pavel Massalsky as Count Aleksei Kirillovich Vronsky  
 Viktor Stanitsyn as Prince Stepan Arkadyevich Oblonsky  
 Ye. Aleyeva as Darya Aleksandrovna Oblonskaya (Dolly) 
 Aleksei Zakalinsky as Seryozha Karenin  
 Angelina Stepanova as Princess Yelizaveta Feodorovna Tverskaya  
 Mariya Durasova as Countess Lidiya Ivanovna 
 N. Slastenina as Countess Vronskaya  
 Grigori Konsky as Count Aleksandr Kirillovich Vronsky  
 Irina Gosheva as Varya Vronskaya 
 Boris Petker as Attorney  
 Yevgeniya Khovanskaya as Princess Myagkaya  
 Sofiya Pilyavskaya as Ambassador's wife  
 N. Mikhajlovskaya as Anna's friend
 Nikolai Svobodin as Diplomat  
 Vladimir Kirillin as Tushkevich  
 P. Lyudvigov 
 A. Guzeyev as a member of the royal family 
 V. Damsky as Karmasov  
 Galina Shostko as Karmasova  
 Sofya Garrel as Freylina  
 V. Markov as Sanovnik  
 Vladimir Popov as Kapitonich, Karenina's butler  
 Aleksei Zhiltsov as Kornei, Karenina's valet  
 V. Dementyeva as Mariya Yefimova  
 Anna Kolomijtseva as Annushka

References

Bibliography 
 Goble, Alan. The Complete Index to Literary Sources in Film. Walter de Gruyter, 1999.

External links 
 

1953 films
1950s historical drama films
Soviet historical drama films
1950s Russian-language films
Films based on Anna Karenina
1953 drama films
Soviet black-and-white films